Giovanni Battista Zeno  (or Zen) (died 7 May 1501) was a cardinal of the Catholic Church.

He was made a cardinal by his uncle, Pope Paul II in November 1468. The Zeno Chapel in St Mark's Basilica, Venice, was built as his tomb.

While bishop, he was the principal consecrator of Giovanni Paternione, Bishop of Malta (1479).

References

15th-century births
Year of birth unknown

1501 deaths

Cardinal-nephews
15th-century Italian cardinals
Cardinal-bishops of Frascati
University of Padua alumni
Burials at St Mark's Basilica
Giovanni Battista
15th-century Italian Roman Catholic bishops